The 2004 FIA GT Imola 500 km was the eighth round the 2004 FIA GT Championship season.  It took place at the Autodromo Enzo e Dino Ferrari, Italy, on September 5, 2004.

This race featured the competition debut of the Maserati MC12, with AF Corse entering two cars.  The FIA had initially refused homologation of the road versions of the MC12 due to the car being wider than the current regulations allow.  However, with agreement from other FIA GT teams, the MC12 was allowed to participate in the GT1 class with revised bodywork, a narrower rear wing, and no ability to score championship points.

Official results
Class winners in bold.  Cars failing to complete 70% of winner's distance marked as Not Classified (NC).

† – #62 G.P.C. Giesse Squadra Corse was disqualified after failing post-race technical inspection.  The car's airbox was larger than regulations allowed.

Statistics
 Pole position – #2 BMS Scuderia Italia – 1:45.593
 Fastest lap – #5 Vitaphone Racing Team – 1:47.399
 Average speed – 158.150 km/h

References

 
 
 

I
Imola 500